Swiss migration to France has resulted in France being home to one of the largest Swiss-born populations outside Switzerland. Migration from the Switzerland to France has increased rapidly from the 1980s onward and by 2013 there were an estimated 194,500 Swiss citizens living in France. Besides Paris, the Swiss living in France have formed communities primarily in Southern France, Brittany, and Corsica.

Notable people

See also 
France–Switzerland relations
German French

References

 
European diaspora in France